Big Band Reflections of Cole Porter is the first studio album by the Jazz Orchestra of the Delta and features trumpeter Marvin Stamm and vocalist Sandra Dudley, this was released in June 2003 on the Summit Records jazz label.   The CD has been extensively reviewed across the United States and the U.K. and garnered consistently high praise from critics as well as charting for over 6 months on JazzWeek Airplay Reporting.  The album is also included in the three CD set The Memphis Jazz Box in 2004 as a part of the contemporary jazz scene in Memphis, Tennessee and the Mid-South region.

Background 

After the Jazz Orchestra of the Delta was established in 1998 the group and musical director were afforded an opportunity by Summit Records to collaborate on a jazz release for the label.   Two things were required by Summit: a theme and a guest artist.   The theme of Cole Porter's music fit well due to a recent Cole Porter tribute with Sandra Dudley the ensemble had performed, native Memphian Marvin Stamm was picked as the guest artist for the release.   There were two failed recording sessions for the release due to severe weather problems and power outages, this delayed the completion of the CD for about 18 months.
 Most recently the entire album was featured on Scott Ellsworth's long running Scott's Place jazz radio show for February 2, 2019.

Track listing 

 EP distributed in late 2003 by Summit Records featuring 'Night and Day' and 10 other artists/cuts from Summit Records for the year.

Recording Sessions 
 November 13, 2000
 December 11, 2000
 February 8, 2001
 June 25, 2001
 January, 2002

Recorded at Sam Phillips Recording Services and U of M STUDIOS A/B

Personnel

Musicians 
Conductor: Jack Cooper 
Trumpet: Marvin Stamm
Vocals: Sandra Dudley
Saxes and woodwinds: John Lux, Mike Krepper, Tom Link, Andre Matlin, Jeff Huddleston, Michael Scott
Trumpets and flugelhorns: David Spencer (lead), Reid McCoy, Ward Yager, Tom Clary
Trombones: Greg Luscombe, Milton Aldana, Lance Green, Ken Spain, Jake Brumbaugh, Bill Flores (Bass Trb)
Guitar: Kerry Movassagh
Piano: Alvie Givhan, Gene Rush
Bass: Tim Goodwin, Sam Shoup
Drums: Bo Harris, James Sexton
Latin percussion: Ed Murray

Production 
Recording engineer and digital transfers: Jeff Cline
Recording engineer, (Phillips Recording): Roland Janes
Mixing engineer(s): Danny Jones and Jack Cooper, at Aztec Studios, Bartlett, TN.
Mastering: David Shirk, Sonorous Mastering
Liner notes: Bob Curnow

Promotion 
On Tuesday evening, July 15, 2003, the Jazz Orchestra of the Delta held the CD release performance and party at the Gibson Guitar Factory & Showcase, one block South of Beale Street in downtown Memphis, TN.   The evening was sponsored by the Mid-South Jazz Foundation and was highly successful with a sell out performance.  Both Sandra Dudley and Marvin Stamm were in attendance for this performance so to showcase the selections from the recording.   Marvin Stamm's improvisation on Twelve is published as a transcribed solo in the Charles Colin publication "The Marvin Stamm Project."  An EP was distributed in late 2003 by Summit Records featuring 'Night and Day' and 10 other artists/cuts from Summit Records for the year.

Reception 

"...(The Jazz Orchestra of the Delta) delivers Big Band Reflections of Cole Porter, an album that is sure to delight fans of ambitious, lush big band music.  Supplemented by singer Sandra Dudley and trumpeter Marvin Stamm, this is a beautifully arranged, executed, and produced album."

David Binder, Jazzreview.com  

"...the result is a cohesive ensemble that understands (Cooper's) musical direction so well that they reproduce precisely what (he) has intended...Balance and phrasing, suitable textures, and mellow harmonic ties follow with glamorous effects."

Jim Santella, L.A. Jazz Scene

"...(the arranger) is to be congratulated on the way he orchestrated some of (Porter's) best known songs, maintaining interest, despite the familiarity with the material.     So in Love comes from...probably Porter's best loved show and Ms. Dudley takes it at a super slow tempo that works brilliantly."

Gordon Jack, Jazz Journal International

"...(Cooper's) arrangements of the Porter standards are knockouts. Propulsive and sassy on an initial listen, revealing subtle shadings and intricate nuances upon repeated listening. Very forthright and mainstream. I might have guessed Don Sebesky as arranger on a blindfold test, for the clean lines and solid constructions that still allow plenty of room for creative soloing."

Dan McClenaghan, All About Jazz

Charts

Release history

See also
Jazz Orchestra of the Delta
Jack Cooper
Memphis Jazz Box
Marvin Stamm
 List of jazz arrangers

References

External links
Summit Records

 French National Library, Notice bibliographique
Big Band Reflections of Cole Porter, Biblioteca Nacional de España
Big Band Reflections of Cole Porter, National Library of Poland, Bibliography Narodowa

2003 albums
Jazz albums by American artists
Big band albums
Mainstream jazz albums
Cole Porter tribute albums